This page lists all peerages created for British princes since 1714.The list does not include creations of the titles of Prince of Wales and Earl of Chester.

List of peerages

In addition, Philip Mountbatten (former Prince Philip of Greece and Denmark) was created Duke of Edinburgh with the subsidiary titles of Earl of Merioneth and Baron Greenwich by George VI in 1947. After that, the Duke of Edinburgh was created a British prince by his wife Elizabeth II in 1957.

See also
Royal dukedoms in the United Kingdom

British princes
peerages
peerages